Thomas John Evans (1872–unknown) was an English footballer who played in the Football League for West Bromwich Albion.

References

1872 births
date of death unknown
English footballers
Association football defenders
English Football League players
West Bromwich Albion F.C. players
Telford United F.C. players
Kettering Town F.C. players
Tottenham Hotspur F.C. players